is a subway station on the Blue Line (Line 3) in Kōhoku-ku, Yokohama, Kanagawa Prefecture, Japan, operated by the Yokohama Municipal Subway.

Lines
Kita Shin-Yokohama Station is served by the Yokohama Municipal Subway Blue Line, and lies 30.8 km from the terminus of the line at Shōnandai Station.

Station layout
The station has a single island platform serving two tracks.

Platforms

History
It was renamed Kita Shin-Yokohama Station on August 29, 1999. Platform screen doors were installed in April 2007.

See also
 List of railway stations in Japan

References
 Harris, Ken and Clarke, Jackie. Jane's World Railways 2008-2009. Jane's Information Group (2008).

External links

 Kita Shin-Yokohama Station (Blue Line) 

Railway stations in Kanagawa Prefecture
Blue Line (Yokohama)
Railway stations in Japan opened in 1993